Presidential primaries and caucuses of the Republican Party took place within all 50 U.S. states and the District of Columbia between February 18 to June 9, 1992. These elections were designed to select the 2,277 delegates to send to the national convention in Houston, Texas from August 17 to August 20, 1992, who selected the Republican Party's nominee for president in the 1992 United States presidential election, incumbent president George H. W. Bush. The delegates also approved the party platform and vice-presidential nominee. Bush went on to lose the general election to the Democratic nominee, Governor Bill Clinton.

Primary race overview
President George H. W. Bush was challenged by conservative commentator Pat Buchanan, and during the early counting of the votes at the New Hampshire primary, it appeared that the President might actually lose. However, Buchanan faded by the end of the evening, and Bush won all the rest of the primaries. Bush's margins in many of the primaries were not as large as expected, and led to the rise of Ross Perot as an independent candidate.

Republican Louisiana State Representative and former Ku Klux Klan leader David Duke also ran in a number of primaries, but he did not receive any delegates. Former Governor Harold Stassen of Minnesota also made a quixotic bid for support in the Minnesota primary, winning enough votes to entitle him to one delegate, but was later denied his single vote by machinations at the Minnesota Republican Party's 1992 state convention.

New Hampshire primary
As Buchanan's candidacy relied heavily on a strong showing in the New Hampshire primary, President Bush made New Hampshire a focal point in his reelection bid. However, New Hampshire still remained a pivotal base for Buchanan's Primary campaign.

Because Bush was widely perceived to have broken his "read my lips" pledge, Buchanan found support in the economically battered and conservative state of New Hampshire. Making Bush's tax-hikes a central theme of his campaign, Buchanan enjoyed healthy grass-roots support despite lagging behind the President in pre-primary polling.

Bush countered the threat posed by Buchanan by touring New Hampshire himself. He memorably told an audience at an Exeter town hall: "Message: I care". Some sources claim that this was the result of Bush mistakenly reading a cue card aloud.

On Primary night, President Bush carried New Hampshire with 53% of the vote. Buchanan finished second with 38% of the vote.

The rest of the race
Despite many in the Bush campaign attempting to push Buchanan out of the race, the strong showing made the Buchanan campaign hope for an outpouring of campaign contributions which galvanized the campaign into making efforts to pull out strong showings such as in the Georgia primary.

Despite an impressive showing, Buchanan's campaign never attracted serious opposition to President Bush in most contests. Most of Buchanan's "victories" were larger-than-expected showings that were still considered landslide Bush wins by most of the media. Still, the fact that Buchanan received more than two million votes nationwide prognosticated trouble for Bush in the general election.

Candidates

Nominee

Other Candidates

Campaign finance

Declined 
 Former Governor Pete duPont of Delaware

Results

Nationwide
Popular vote result:
 George H. W. Bush (inc.) - 9,199,463 (72.84%)
 Pat Buchanan - 2,899,488 (22.96%)
 Unpledged delegates - 287,383 (2.28%)
 David Duke - 119,115 (0.94%)
 Ross Perot - 56,136 (0.44%)
 Pat Paulsen - 10,984 (0.09%)
 Maurice Horton - 9,637 (0.08%)
 Harold Stassen - 8,099 (0.06%)
 Jack Fellure - 6,296 (0.05%)

See also
1992 Democratic Party presidential primaries
George H. W. Bush 1992 presidential campaign
Supermarket scanner moment

Notes

References